Poipū Beach Park is located in the community of Poipū on the southern coast of Kauai island in Hawaii.

The beach is a park has lifeguards provided by county of Kauai. There are swimming and snorkeling areas, and a surf break over a reef for experienced surfers only. It can get crowded on weekends. 
It was ranked as the best beach in America by Florida International University professor Stephen Leatherman, "Dr Beach" in 2001. Just west of the county park are the Moir Gardens on the Kiahuna plantation.

References

External links

 
 hawaiiyeah.com

Beaches of Kauai
Parks in Hawaii
Protected areas of Kauai